Southern Nomads R.U.F.C. is an amateur Rugby Football club in Port Erin, Isle of Man.

The Southern Nomads RUFC formed in 1982 who play on the Isle of Man and have played competitively in the Manx Shield and Manx Cup competitions every year since then. Regularly finishing in the top three places. They have won the coveted Manx Shield four times; most recently in the 2009/10 season. Nomads have also competed in the Cheshire Plate and will continue to persevere to improve their record there.

The Club is based in the south of the Island, primarily between the villages of Port Erin and Port St. Mary, and play home matches at King William's College.

Nomads 2nd team have formed in their own right as the Emerging Southern Nomads

With a ‘senior’ membership of at least 50 players, and about 80 ‘youngsters’ they need to and are endeavoring to secure facilities of their own to evolve from our ‘Nomadic’ nature, provide the membership with the facilities they deserve, and ensure the Club's future. To this end they have formed Charity no. 1001, 'SPort Erin'.

Club honours
Cheshire Plate winners (2): 2012, 2014
Cheshire Bowl winners: 2015

See also
Isle of Man Sport
Western Vikings Rugby Club
Castletown Rugby Club
Douglas Rugby Club
Ramsey Rugby Club
Vagabonds Rugby Club

External links
 Official web site

Rugby union in the Isle of Man
Manx rugby union teams
Rugby clubs established in 1982
1982 establishments in the Isle of Man